Putte is a village on the border between Belgium and the Netherlands.

The village is marked by the borders that run through it. The Dutch part is in Woensdrecht, North Brabant. The Belgian part is mostly the municipality of Kapellen and a small part in the municipality of Stabroek, both are in the province of Antwerp.

The Nationale Sluitingsprijs, the last road bicycle racing of the season, is held in Putte.

History
The village became the property of the Duke of Hoogstraten in 1714. In 1828, the village was divided into a Dutch and Belgian part. The main part of the village is on the Belgian side. The population of the village in 2007 was 3,464 people.

Gallery

See also
 Putte, Netherlands

References

External links
 

Belgium–Netherlands border crossings
Populated places in Antwerp Province
Kapellen, Belgium